That's the Way It Is is the twelfth studio album by American singer and musician Elvis Presley, released on RCA Records, LSP 4445, in November 1970. It consists of eight studio tracks recorded at RCA Studio B in Nashville, and four live in-concert tracks recorded at The International Hotel in Las Vegas. It accompanied the theatrical release of the documentary film Elvis: That's the Way It Is, although it is not generally considered a soundtrack album. The album peaked at number 21 on the Billboard 200 and at number eight on the country chart. It was certified Gold on June 28, 1973, by the Recording Industry Association of America and up-graded to Platinum, for sales of a million copies on March 8, 2018.

Content

The original vinyl LP consisted of eight tracks recorded in the studio in Nashville at the marathon sessions in June 1970 that would also yield several singles and the Elvis Country album, and four tracks from his August 1970 engagement at The International Hotel in Las Vegas. The track "You Don't Have to Say You Love Me" had been released as the advance single on October 6; its b-side, "Patch It Up", appears in a live version here. "The Next Step Is Love" had previously been released as a B-side in July 1970, and its A-side "I've Lost You" appears in a live version here too. The concert version of "I Just Can't Help Believin" from this album was released as a single in the United Kingdom in November 1971, reaching number six on the UK Singles Chart. Its b-side "How the Web Was Woven" was also taken from this album. A rehearsal version of the latter song was featured in the 1970 documentary Elvis: That's the Way It Is.

Reissues
In 2009, the Follow That Dream label released The Wonder of You which contains the full concert from August 13, 1970. Some concert footage from that date was used in the documentary.

On July 6, 2012, Follow That Dream released a two-disc LP special edition of the album. This edition offers highlights from the 2-CD Follow That Dream release. It contains 21 tracks and features different takes of the songs.

Track listing

Original release

2000 special edition

2008 FTD 2 discs Special Edition

2012 LP Special Edition

Personnel
Sourced from Keith Flynn.

Studio tracks

 Elvis Presley – lead vocals, guitar, harmony vocals on “Bridge Over Troubled Water”
 James Burton – lead guitar
 Chip Young – rhythm guitar
 Charlie Hodge – harmony vocals, acoustic rhythm guitar
 David Briggs – piano, organ on "How the Web Was Woven"
 Norbert Putnam – bass
 Jerry Carrigan – drums
 Charlie McCoy – organ, harmonica, marimba on "Just Pretend,” “Twenty Days and Twenty Nights,” and “Bridge Over Troubled Water”
 Farrell Morris – percussion, vibes
 Weldon Myrick – steel guitar on "How the Web Was Woven"
 The Jordanaires – backing vocals
 The Imperials – backing vocals

Live tracks
 Elvis Presley – lead vocals, guitar
 James Burton – lead guitar
 John Wilkinson – rhythm guitar
 Charlie Hodge – harmony and backing vocals, acoustic rhythm guitar, scarves
 Glen Hardin – piano, electric piano
 Jerry Scheff – bass
 Ronnie Tutt – drums
 Millie Kirkham – backing vocals
 The Sweet Inspirations – backing vocals
 The Imperials – backing vocals
 The Joe Guercio Orchestra

Charts

Certifications

References

External links 

Albums produced by Felton Jarvis
1970 albums
Elvis Presley albums
RCA Records albums